Jija Hari Singh (born 8 January 1951) was the first woman (Indian Police Service) IPS Officer from Karnataka. She remained in service for 36 years before retirement in 2011 as Director General of Police (DGP).

Jija has many popular tags bestowed on her. The J Mag on women's special cover story adorned with a beautiful picture of her describes Jija M Harisingh as the first lady IPS officer in South India.

Indian Police Service career 

Jija Hari Singh qualified the civil services exam and chose Indian Police Service (IPS) in the year 1975, when joining the police force was not an option for a woman. Kiran Bedi was in training at that time, but there was no one else.

Early life and education 

Dr. Jija Hari Singh started her schooling in the Holy Angels Convent in Trivandrum. She also studied in several other schools including Government school in Sreekaryam and in Palakkad too. She did her graduation and post graduation in English literature from the University College. While doing her post graduation she developed the hobby of creative writing and also acquired a post graduate diploma in Journalism. Even after joining the Indian Police Service in 1975, she continued her learning and education, doing many in service training programs in India and abroad. She also gained another MA Degree in Sociology from Mysore University. She went on to work on a PhD in Development Studies on the topic of her special interest, women’s empowerment, doing a socio-economic study of the women recruited into Police in the state of Karnataka, from Police Constable to DSP.

Research study with title Gender status in Karnataka police a study of entry level cadres in women police under University of Mysore by Jija Madhavan Harisingh is published in Shodhganga.

Artist of repute 
A recipient of the Indira Priyadarshini National Award for Contribution to Arts, Jija Harisingh is an artist of repute who has held solo exhibitions in Washington, Wollongong and New Delhi. Her work has also been exhibited in London, Vienna, Berlin, Jakarta etc. Jija Madhavan Harisingh was one of the fifty Indian women artists chosen by Indian Council for Cultural Relations (ICCR) for the international exhibitions of the Amrita Shergil Revisited project.

Jija is presently the President of the Institute of Directors, Bangalore Chapter and the Honorary President of The Art Mantram Foundation, a not-for-profit trust that promotes Indian art.

References

External links 
 

1951 births
Living people
Indian police chiefs
Indian civil rights activists
Indian anti-corruption activists
Indian women police officers
Indian Police Service officers
 Karnataka Police